The Mole-Dagbon are a meta-ethnicity and western Oti-Volta Gur ethno-linguistic group residing in six present-day West Africa countries namely: Benin, Burkina Faso, Ghana, Ivory Coast, Mali and Togo. They number more than 15 million.

References

Ethnic groups in Benin
Dagbon
Ethnic groups in Burkina Faso
Ethnic groups in Ghana
Ethnic groups in Ivory Coast
Ethnic groups in Mali
Ethnic groups in Togo